The International Federation of Film Critics (FIPRESCI, short for Fédération Internationale de la Presse Cinématographique) is an association of national organizations of professional film critics and film journalists from around the world for "the promotion and development of film culture and for the safeguarding of professional interests." It was founded in June 1930 in Brussels, Belgium. At present it has members in more than 50 countries worldwide. In reaction to the 2022 Russian invasion of Ukraine, FIPRESCI announced that it will not participate in festivals and other events organized by the Russian government and its offices, and canceled a colloquium in St. Petersburg, that was to make it familiar with new Russian films.

FIPRESCI Award

The FIPRESCI often gives out awards during film festivals (such as at the Berlin International Film Festival, the Cannes Film Festival, Vienna International Film Festival, the Toronto International Film Festival, the Venice Film Festival, the Warsaw Film Festival, and the International Film Festival of Kerala) to recognize examples of enterprising filmmaking.

Winners of the award include:

Robert Bresson refused this award at the 1974 Cannes Film Festival.

FIPRESCI Grand Prix
The FIPRESCI Grand Prix was created in 1999, and is presented every year at the San Sebastián Film Festival. It is the federation’s most representative acknowledgement, as it is not chosen by a jury (like the international critics prize awarded to a film from a festival program), but is elected by all members, and all feature-length productions of the previous twelve months are eligible.

Winners include:
1985 - Faces of Women (Visages de femmes), Desiré Ecaré
1998 - The Hole, Tsai Ming-liang
1999 - All About My Mother (Todo sobre mi madre), Pedro Almodóvar
2000 - Magnolia, Paul Thomas Anderson
2001 - The Circle, Jafar Panahi
2002 - The Man Without a Past, Aki Kaurismäki
2003 - Uzak, Nuri Bilge Ceylan
2004 - Notre musique, Jean-Luc Godard
2005 - 3-Iron, Kim Ki-duk
2006 - Volver, Pedro Almodóvar
2007 - 4 Months, 3 Weeks and 2 Days, Cristian Mungiu
2008 - There Will Be Blood, Paul Thomas Anderson
2009 - The White Ribbon, Michael Haneke
2010 - The Ghost Writer, Roman Polanski
2011 - The Tree of Life, Terrence Malick
2012 - Amour, Michael Haneke
2013 - Blue Is the Warmest Colour (La vie d'Adèle), Abdellatif Kechiche
2014 - Boyhood, Richard Linklater
2015 - Mad Max: Fury Road, George Miller
2016 - Toni Erdmann, Maren Ade
2017 - The Other Side of Hope, Aki Kaurismäki
2018 - Phantom Thread, Paul Thomas Anderson
2019 - Roma, Alfonso Cuarón
2020 - Not awarded
2021 - Nomadland, Chloé Zhao
2022 - Drive My Car, Ryusuke Hamaguchi
Paul Thomas Anderson is the only director to win this award three times.

Journal
As of 2005, it also offers an online cinema journal, Undercurrents, edited by film critic Chris Fujiwara.

References

External links

Undercurrents online journal

Organizations established in 1930
Film organisations in Belgium
Film critics associations
International cultural organizations
Non-profit organisations based in Germany